Tenagomysis is a genus of mysid shrimps in the family Mysidae, containing the following species:

Tenagomysis australis Fenton, 1991 
Tenagomysis bruniensis Fenton, 1991 
Tenagomysis chiltoni W. Tattersall, 1923
Tenagomysis longipes Murano, 2006
Tenagomysis longisquama Fukuoka & Bruce, 2005    
Tenagomysis macropsis W. Tattersall, 1923
Tenagomysis natalensis O. S. Tattersall, 1952 
Tenagomysis novaezealandiae Thomson, 1900
Tenagomysis producta W. Tattersall, 1923
Tenagomysis robusta W. Tattersall, 1923
Tenagomysis scotti W. Tattersall, 1923 
Tenagomysis similis W. Tattersall, 1923
Tenagomysis tanzaniana Bacescu, 1975
Tenagomysis tasmaniae Fenton, 1991
Tenagomysis tenuipes W. Tattersall, 1918 
Tenagomysis thomsoni W. Tattersall, 1923

Ten species of Tenagomysis are known from New Zealand, all of them endemic.

References

External links

 Seafriends
 Photo of Tenagomysis novaezealandiae

Mysida